Andrew Goatly is an English language professor at Lingnan University in Hong Kong.

Career 
Goatly studied English at Jesus College, Oxford before working for Voluntary Service Overseas in Rwanda and Thailand. On returning to the United Kingdom he worked as a schoolteacher before obtaining a doctorate at University College, London and thereafter teaching at Chiang Mai University in Thailand, the National University of Singapore and Lingnan University, Hong Kong. He has written:

 The Language of Metaphors, and Critical Reading and Writing, published by Routledge
 Washing the Brain: the hidden ideology of metaphor, published by John Benjamins
 Explorations in Stylistics, published by Equinox
 Meaning and Humour, published by Cambridge University Press.
Two Dimensions of Meaning: Similarity and Contiguity in Language, Culture and Ecology published by Routledge

References

Living people
Alumni of Jesus College, Oxford
Academic staff of the National University of Singapore
Alumni of University College London
Linguists from the United Kingdom
Year of birth missing (living people)